Salvatore Burruni (11 April 1933 – 30 March 2004) was an Italian flyweight and bantamweight boxer who fought between 1957 and 1969.

Amateur career
Burruni was Italian flyweight champion in 1954 and 1956 and won the World Military Championships in 1955 and 1956 as well as the Mediterranean Games in 1955. At the 1956 Melbourne Olympics he progressed to the second round when he lost to Vladimir Stolnikov.

Professional career
Burruni turned professional in 1958. After successfully campaigning for seven years, during which he won the European Flyweight title, Burruni was given a title shot by WBA, WBC against Lineal flyweight champion Pone Kingpetch from Thailand. On 23 April 1965, Burruni made the most of his opportunity and won a unanimous 15-round decision.

However, on November 1965, WBA & WBC stripped him of the title following his refusal to meet themandatory challenger, Hiroyuki Ebihara.

On 2 December 1965, Burruni successfully defended his lineal crown by knocking out Australian Rocky Gattellari.On 14 June 1966, he lost to Walter McGowan, whom he had defeated previously.

Unable to make the weight any longer, Burruni moved up to the bantamweight division. He won the European Bantamweight title by taking a 15-round decision from champion Mimoun Ben Ali in 1968. His campaign to secure a World Bantamweight title ended when he was knocked out by Rubén Olivares in 1968. Burruni's final fight took place in 1969, when he defeated Pierre Vetroff by KO.

Professional boxing record

See also 
 List of flyweight boxing champions
 List of WBA world champions
 List of WBC world champions
 List of The Ring world champions
 List of undisputed boxing champions

References

External links
 Salvatore Burruni - CBZ Profile

|-

|-

|-

1933 births
2004 deaths
People from Alghero
Flyweight boxers
World boxing champions
World flyweight boxing champions
World Boxing Association champions
World Boxing Council champions
The Ring (magazine) champions
Olympic boxers of Italy
Boxers at the 1956 Summer Olympics
Italian male boxers
Sportspeople from Sardinia
Mediterranean Games gold medalists for Italy
Boxers at the 1955 Mediterranean Games
Mediterranean Games medalists in boxing
20th-century Italian people